Perissomerus is a genus of beetles in the family Cerambycidae, containing the following species:

 Perissomerus alvarengai Martins, 1961
 Perissomerus dasytes Martins, 1968
 Perissomerus flammeus Martins, 1971
 Perissomerus hilairei Gounelle, 1909
Perissomerus machadoi Martins, Galileo & Santos-Silva, 2016
 Perissomerus rubrus Martins & Galileo, 2007
 Perissomerus ruficollis Martins, 1961

References

Ibidionini